Bahman Shirvani (born January 28, 1989) is an Iranian footballer who plays for Shahin Bushehr F.C. in the Azadegan League.

Club career
Shirvani joined Shahin Bushehr F.C. in 2010 after spending the previous two seasons at Bargh Shiraz F.C.

Club Career Statistics

Honours

Club
Hazfi Cup
Runner up:1
2011–12 with Shahin Bushehr

References

1989 births
Living people
Bargh Shiraz players
Shahin Bushehr F.C. players
Iranian footballers
Association football defenders
People from Sanandaj